Anteholosticha azerbaijanica is a species of hypotrich, a group of protists. It was discovered in Azerbaijan, at the south coast of the Absheron Peninsula. It has three frontal cirri, a slender elongate body 220-300 μm long, with rear portion narrowed tail-like. The body is flattened. The species has been preliminarily assigned to the genus Anteholosticha.

References

Hypotrichea
Biota of Azerbaijan